Felice D. Gaer (born 1946) is an American human rights defender and advocate. She has worked on human rights matters and was a longstanding member and the former chair of the United States Commission on International Religious Freedom. She is a member of the US National Commission to UNESCO.

Gaer directs the Jacob Blaustein Institute for the Advancement of Human Rights of the American Jewish Committee, which conducts research and advocacy to strengthen international human rights. Gaer served on the United States Commission on International Religious Freedom from 2001 to 2012, having been nominated by the Clinton administration and renominated by the Bush administration and Obama administration, and later by Speaker of the House Nancy Pelosi.

Gaer was the first American to serve as an Independent Expert on the United Nations Committee Against Torture. There, she had been Vice Chair. Gaer is also a member of the  Council on Foreign Relations.

Early life and education
Gaer was born in Englewood, New Jersey. She graduated Wellesley College with an A.B. in Political Science (1968).  From Columbia University, she received a Master of Arts degree in 1971 and a Master of Philosophy degree in Political Science in 1975.

Career
Gaer's career has involved human rights both nationally and internationally, working in different committees and commissions.

United Nations
Since 2000, she has been an independent expert on the UN Committee Against Torture. She became the committee's vice-chair in 2009. Furthermore, she was a rapporteur on Gender on the same committee from 2001 to 2006; and follow-up rapporteur on country compliance from 2003 to 2014.

United States
Gaer has been a public member and/or public advisor of different US delegations: 
 United Nations World Conference on Human Rights, Vienna (June 1993)
 United Nations World Conference on Women, Beijing (September 1995)
 Preparatory Conference, World Conference on Human Settlements (February 1996)
 United Nations Commission on Human Rights (2003–2006)

She was a commissioner of the United States Commission on International Religious Freedom (2001–2012). During that period she occupied served as the commission's chair (2002-2003), then vice-chair (2003-2006), then chair again (2006-2009).

Gaer became a term member of the Council on Foreign Relations from 1976 until 1981 and later she became a life member (1991). 
She has been a commissioner of the US National Commission to UNESCO since 2012.

She has served on many other committees, associations and councils, including:
 President of the International Friends of the Chilean Human Rights Commission (1985–1990)
 International League for Human Rights, Board of Governors (1991–2005)
 The Carter Center, Emory University, International Humans Rights Council (1994–2003)
 Human Rights Watch, Advisory Committee of the Europe and Central Asia Division (1996–present)
 Chair of the National Coalition for the 50th Anniversary of the Universal Declaration of Human Rights, Steering Committee (1997–1999)
 Franklin and Eleanor Roosevelt Institute, Board of Directors (2001–2004) and Board of Governors (2001–2004)
 Eleanor Roosevelt Center at Val-Kill, Board of Directors (2004–2009)
 Chair of the Leo Nevas Task Force on Human Rights, United Nations Association of the USA (since 2011)

She has testified before numerous US Congressional committees on International Relations, Human Rights, Justice, and the Tom Lantos Commission.

Beyond public service
Gaer has participated on various committees, organizations and associations.

She was a program officer from the international division of the international organizations of the Ford Foundation (1974–1981).
She was the executive director of the International League for Human Rights (1982–1991), followed by the executive director of the European programs of the United Nations Association of the US (1991–1992).

She has been the director of the American Jewish Committee's Jacob Blaustein Institute for the Advancement of Human Rights since 1993. In 2010, she was a regents professor in the Department of History of the University of California, Los Angeles (UCLA).

Publications (selected)

Books

Journal articles

Encyclopedia entries

References

External links
Biography from the American Jewish Committee
Biography from the United Nations Office of the High Commissioner for Human Rights
Biography from the United States Commission on International Religious Freedom
Felice Gaer's CV, United States Mission to the United Nations and Other International Organizations in Geneva

1946 births
American human rights activists
Women human rights activists
Wellesley College alumni
Columbia Graduate School of Arts and Sciences alumni
Living people
Anti-torture activists
Members of the United Nations Committee against Torture
American officials of the United Nations
American Jewish Committee